is a Japanese footballer who plays as a forward for J2 League club Blaublitz Akita, on loan from Sagan Tosu.

Career statistics

Club
.

Notes

References

2000 births
Living people
Association football people from Saitama Prefecture
Kokushikan University alumni
Japanese footballers
Association football forwards
Sagan Tosu players
Blaublitz Akita players